Dos Grandes (Eng.: Two Great Ones) is a compilation album released by Marco Antonio Solís and Joan Sebastian on June 29, 2004. There is also an Enhanced Edition which is a CD with DVD. The album was certified gold in Mexico by AMPROFON.

Track listing

Chart performance

Sales and certifications

References

External links
Marco Antonio Solís Official website
Joan Sebastían Official website
Amazon.com: Dos Grandes 
Music.barnesandnoble.com: Dos Grandes

Joan Sebastian compilation albums
Marco Antonio Solís compilation albums
2004 compilation albums
2004 video albums
Music video compilation albums
Regional Mexican music compilation albums
Fonovisa Records compilation albums